Sergey Anatolyevich Timofeyev (born 5 March 1965) is a Kazakhstani professional football coach and a former player.

He played for Kairat Almaty in the Soviet Top League as well as FC Dynamo Moscow and FC Alania Vladikavkaz in the Russian Premier League.

Timofeev made five appearances for the Kazakhstan national football team from 1997 through 1999. He also was the manager of the national team from 2004 to 2005 in World Cup 2006 qualifiers.

Honours
 Russian Premier League champion: 1995.
 Kazakhstan Premier League champion: 2002, 2003.
 Russian Premier League runner-up: 1994, 1996.
 Russian Premier League bronze: 1992, 1993.
 Kazakhstan Premier League bronze: 2000.
 Russian Cup winner: 1995.

References

External links
 

1965 births
Living people
People from Pavlodar
Kazakhstani footballers
Kazakhstan international footballers
Kazakhstani expatriate footballers
FC Sokol Saratov players
FC Kairat players
FC Irtysh Pavlodar players
FC Kyzylzhar players
FC Dynamo Moscow players
FC Spartak Vladikavkaz players
FC Nyva Ternopil players
Kazakhstani football managers
Kazakhstan national football team managers
Expatriate football managers in Russia
FC Lokomotiv Nizhny Novgorod players
Russian Premier League players
Ukrainian Premier League players
Russian expatriate sportspeople in Kazakhstan
Expatriate footballers in Ukraine
Kazakhstani expatriate sportspeople in Ukraine
FC Sodovik Sterlitamak managers
Association football defenders